Pita Elisara (November 16, 1976 – October 16, 2018) was an American football offensive lineman.

A native of American Samoa, Elisara grew up playing rugby and football. After high school, he spent two years at Palomar College while living with some of his brothers, who were serving in the US Navy, in Oceanside, California. In 1998, he transferred to Indiana University, where he became an All-Big Ten offensive lineman. He started all 11 games in 1999 for the Hoosiers.

Being not selected in the 2000 NFL Draft, Elisara was signed onto the New York Giants off-season roster, but eventually cut. He was then selected in the 2001 XFL Draft by the short-lived San Francisco Demons. The following years he spent on several NFL teams' off-season roster, while being assigned to NFL Europe squads during the season.

He died on October 16, 2018 in Del City, Oklahoma.

References

External links
Just Sports Stats
San Francisco Demons bio

1976 births
2018 deaths
People from 'Ili'ili
American sportspeople of Samoan descent
Players of American football from American Samoa
Indiana Hoosiers football players
Scottish Claymores players
Rhein Fire players
San Francisco Demons players
Palomar Comets football players